Katharina Grießemer (born 13 July 1986) is a German former footballer who played as a defender, notably in the Frauen-Bundesliga for Bayern Munich, Hamburger SV and TSV Crailsheim. She represented the Germany U17 and Germany U19 national teams at international level.

Career
From 2003 to 2008 Grießemer played in the Frauen-Bundesliga for Bayern Munich, Hamburger SV(31 July 2005). Stammplatz in Hamburg statt Bank in München, Allgäuer Zeitung and TSV Crailsheim.  Afterwards, she played for lower-tier teams including 1. FC Nürnberg (Bayernliga) and SV 67 Weinberg (Regionalliga Süd).

A daughter of a former footballer and manager, Grießemer began playing club football with local side FC Memmingen.  At age 16, she joined Bayern Munich becoming the club's youngest senior player. After two seasons playing for Bayern Munich, Grießemer moved to Hamburger SV. However, early in her first season, she suffered a knee injury, which would require four operations to address. In September 2006, she terminated her contract with Hamburger SV, and joined Crailsheim in the 2006–07 season winter break. However, she re-injured her knee in a friendly match before the season restarted.

As an Under-19 international Grießemer took part in the 2004 U-19 European Championship.

References

External links
 
 Profile at Fussballdaten.de

1986 births
Living people
People from Roth (district)
Sportspeople from Middle Franconia
German women's footballers
Footballers from Bavaria
Women's association football defenders
Germany women's youth international footballers